Hussein Kamel Bahaeddin (18 September 1932 – 29 July 2016) was an Egyptian professor of paediatrics and education minister between 1991 and 2004.

Biography

Early life and education 
Hussein Kamel Bahaeddin was born on 18 September 1932 in Zagazig, Sharqia Governorate, Egypt, to a mother (Mona) who converted in 1943 from Christianity to Islam before meeting Bahaeddin's father (Kamel) in London. Bahaeddin received his Bachelor of Medicine and Surgery in 1954 and then a doctorate in paediatrics from Cairo University in 1959. In 1965, he became secretary of the Egyptian Youth Organisation until 1968.

Medical career 
In 1962, Bahaeddin joined the Faculty of Medicine, Cairo University as a lecturer and, in 1973, he was promoted to professor of paediatrics. He then assumed the positions of head of the paediatric department and director of the new university children's hospital between 1983 and 1991.
 
Bahaeddin was a member of the Egyptian Scientific Academy, and in 1989 he assumed the presidency of the Egyptian Society of Paediatrics until 1991. He was awarded the World Health Organization‘s Child Health Foundation Fellowship in 1989.

Minister of Education 
Bahaeddin served as Minister of Education between 1991 and 2004. During his tenure, he extended compulsory education to six years, and prohibited corporal punishment, even in private schools. However, a 1998 study found that random physical punishment (not proper formal corporal punishment) was being used extensively by teachers in Egypt to punish behavior they regarded as unacceptable. Around 80 percent of the boys and 60 percent of the girls were punished by teachers using their hands, sticks, straps, shoes, punches, and kicks as the most common administration methods. The most commonly reported injuries were bumps and contusions.
 
Bahaeddin uncapped the number of university entrance exams, which was limited to one. He believed that poverty and malnutrition are responsible for the low academic and achievement level of students and this step will, firstly, to eliminate the fear of the National Secondary Exam, and secondly, the student who did not receive private lessons will be compensated because "repetition ensures improving performance". However, repeating the exam requires paying the exam fees.
 
In 1994, Bahaeddin tried to pass a rule that would have prohibited schoolgirls from donning the hijab unless their parents provided a letter of consent to the school. However, the decree was withdrawn due to public outcry over the measure, which was seen as part of a systematic campaign against Islamists and the Muslim Brotherhood in Egypt.
 
In 1998, Bahaeddin passed a decree that would punish any student proven to have assaulted a teacher with final dismissal.
 
Bahaeddin frequently discussed democracy and the need to support instructors in engaging pupils in more democratic practices. A workshop on using democratic instruments in the classroom was conducted by the Group for Democratic Development (GDD) in 1999 for Upper-Egyptian teachers. The Education Ministry received the GDD's findings and an offer to assist them in more training sessions along with their findings. Subsequently, close to 30 workshop attendees were held at the State Security Office for up to 24 hours. The Ministry of Education then withheld 15 days of each participant's monthly pay and accused them of teaching homosexuality and atheism.
 
In 2003, Bahaeddin defended the government's control over education by emphasising that doing so would prevent "enculturation and socialisation" and promote national harmony, as the military, economy, and political spheres all have a stake in education as a matter of national security. However, following the 2011 Egyptian revolution, the Ministry of Education removed over 20 percent of the instructional materials that was focused on the achievements and legacies of the disbanded National Democratic Party (NDP) from the national curricula.
 
In 2004, the Ministry of Education dismissed a considerable number of educators that it alleged had pro-Islamic and Muslim Brotherhood leanings. The decision was made after receiving information from ministry managers and security personnel, as well as complaints from the parents of the pupils. According to a report in the Gulf News, the decision was not made in reaction to US demands for reforms that would "eliminate a climate that Washington considers as helping to breed terrorism". These reforms went to the extent of removing Quranic verses and the sayings of the Prophet Mohammed from school texts as part of the "New Basic Education Bilateral Agreement" with the US which will provide $64 million USD. United States Agency for International Development (USAID) has donated more than $765 million USD to Egypt since 1975.

On 9 July 2004, Bahaeddin was succeeded by Ahmed Gamal El-Din Moussa as the new Minister of Education, following a cabinet reshuffle led by Prime Minister Ahmed Nazif.

Personal life and death 
Bahaeddin married Samiha Abdel Salam Soliman on 3 February 1966. He died on 29 July 2016 after a struggle with illness.

Awards and honours 
Bahaeddin was awarded the Child Health Foundation Fellowship by Ihsan Doğramacı Family Health Foundation in 1989. He was elected a Fellow of the Royal College of Physicians and Surgeons in 1993. He received an Honorary Doctorate of Science from the University of Glasgow, Hacettepe University and University of East Anglia in 1997, and St. Olaf College in 1999.
 
In 2006, Bahaeddin received the Egyptian Order of the Republic (First Class). In 2008, he was elected honorary president of the International Society of Tropical Pediatrics for life. In 2009, he became a member of the International Children’s Institute (ICC), Ankara, and was elected in the same year as honorary president.
 
Hussein Kamel Bahaeddin Primary School in Alexandria was named posthumously after him.

References

External links 
 Think for seconds, gain minutes — interview by Najwa Ibrahim (in Arabic)
 

Cairo University alumni
Year of birth missing
Ihsan Doğramacı Family Health Foundation Prize laureates
Egyptian physicians
1932 births
2016 deaths